The Wenzhou–Lishui Expressway, commonly referred to as the Wenli Expressway is an expressway that connects the cities of Wenzhou, Zhejiang, China, and Lishui, Zhejiang. The expressway is a spur of G15 Shenyang–Haikou Expressway and is entirely in Zhejiang Province.

References

Chinese national-level expressways
Expressways in Zhejiang